Teklemariam Shanko Balcha (born 2 January 1998) is an Ethiopian professional footballer who plays as a goalkeeper for Ethiopian Premier League club Defence Force and the Ethiopia national team.

International career 
In 2016, Shanko played for the Ethiopia national under-20 team during their participation in the 2017 Africa U-20 Cup of Nations qualification. He has been named to the senior national team for 2021 AFCON qualifiers.

References 

1998 births
Living people
Sportspeople from Oromia Region
Ethiopian footballers
Association football goalkeepers
Hawassa City S.C. players
Ethiopian Coffee S.C. players
Ethiopia international footballers
2021 Africa Cup of Nations players